"Lie to Me" is a song by American rock band Bon Jovi. It was released on November 13, 1995, as the third single from their album These Days.

Background
The song is about a broken relationship which involves lovers who face crises and struggles. The song charted at number 88 on the US Billboard Hot 100, number 10 on the UK Singles Chart, and number nine on the Finnish Singles Chart.

Although a fan favorite, Bon Jovi only performed "Lie to Me" live two times since the conclusion of the These Days Tour, with one being on June 25, 2008, and the other on July 17, 2011.

Track listings

US CD, 7-inch, and cassette single (with "Something for the Pain")
 "Something for the Pain" (edit) – 3:57
 "Lie to Me" – 5:33

US maxi-CD single (with "Something for the Pain")
 "Something for the Pain" – 4:46
 "Lie to Me" – 5:33
 "Wild in the Streets" (live) – 5:01
 "634-5789" – 3:08

UK CD1; Australian CD and cassette single
 "Lie to Me" (album version) – 5:33
 "Something for the Pain" (album version) – 4:46
 "Hey God" (live) – 6:16
 "I'll Sleep When I'm Dead" (live) – 7:34

UK CD2
 "Lie to Me" (edit) – 4:43
 "Something for the Pain" (live) – 5:30
 "Always" (live) – 7:18
 "Keep the Faith" (live) – 7:22

UK cassette single and European CD single
 "Lie to Me" – 5:33
 "I'll Sleep When I'm Dead" (live) – 7:34 (5:36 in Europe)

Australian limited-edition CD single
 "Lie to Me" – 5:33
 "Something for the Pain" (live) – 5:36
 "Always" (live) – 7:35
 "Keep the Faith" (live) – 7:24

Japanese CD1
 "Lie to Me" (album version)
 "Something for the Pain" (live)
 "Always" (live)
 "I'll Sleep When I'm Dead" (live)

Japanese CD2
 "Lie to Me" (radio edit version)
 "Keep the Faith" (live)
 "Hey God" (live)
 "634-5789"

Charts

Release history

References

1995 singles
1995 songs
American soft rock songs
Bon Jovi songs
Mercury Records singles
Music videos directed by Marty Callner
Rock ballads
Song recordings produced by Peter Collins (record producer)
Songs written by Jon Bon Jovi
Songs written by Richie Sambora